The Call of the Road is a 1920 British silent historical adventure film directed by A. E. Coleby and starring Victor McLaglen, Phyllis Shannaw and Warwick Ward.

Cast
 Victor McLaglen as Alf Truscott  
 Phyllis Shannaw as Lady Rowena  
 Warwick Ward as Lord Delavel  
 Philip Williams as Sir Martin Trevor  
 A. E. Coleby as Punch Murphy  
 Adeline Hayden Coffin as Lady Ullswater  
 Ernest A. Douglas as Silas  
 Henry Nicholls-Bates as Paganini Primus  
 Barry Furness as Pagnini Secundus 
 Fred Drummond as Hammer John  
 Olive Bell as Miller's Wife 
 Cyril McLaglen 
 Tom Ronald as Master Alfred's Man  
 Eric Royce as Master Ulleswater

References

Bibliography
 Low, Rachel. The History of British Film: Volume IV, 1918–1929. Routledge, 1997.

External links

1920 films
British historical adventure films
British silent feature films
1920s historical adventure films
Films directed by A. E. Coleby
Films set in England
Films set in the 1820s
British black-and-white films
1920s English-language films
1920s British films
Silent historical adventure films